Kathrin Nikolussi (born 4 June 1978) is an Australian alpine skier. She competed in the women's slalom at the 2002 Winter Olympics.

References

1978 births
Living people
Australian female alpine skiers
Olympic alpine skiers of Australia
Alpine skiers at the 2002 Winter Olympics
People from Feldkirch, Vorarlberg